Workington is the name of an industrial suburb in the South West of Harare, Zimbabwe.

Suburbs of Harare